Super Chexx® is a table hockey arcade game manufactured by Innovative Concepts in Entertainment Inc. (ICE) from 1988 to 2017.  ICE began manufacturing CHEXX bubble hockey in 1982 and it quickly became one of the top-earning bar and arcade games of the 1980s.  Enhancements to the game were added and it was renamed Super Chexx in 1988 and it continued to be popular in bars and arcades and received national acclaim during the Bud Light Bubble Boys tournament series from 1999-2001.  In November 2017 Super Chexx was replaced with the Super Chexx Pro edition using enhanced electronics featuring a 5" LCD jumbotron and LED lighting.  Super Chexx Pro is still made in the USA in Clarence, New York just outside Buffalo.  These types of games are also known as bubble hockey, rod hockey, table hockey or dome hockey because of the long rods used to control the players and the distinctive dome or "bubble" covering the playing field.

The game can be played by two opposing players who control all five hockey players and the goalie for their side (singles) or as a two on two game (doubles). Players control their five skaters with long rods that move in and out to bring skaters up and down the ice and spin 360 degrees.  A knob is used to move the goalie from side to side.  Each player also a "boo button" to simulate sounds from the crowd.

Vintage versions of Super Chexx feature the USA vs. Russia, Canada vs. Russia, or USA vs. Canada formats. In 2010 ICE introduced a Deluxe Home version of the game with no coin doors and started offering NHL and AHL licensed team versions. There is also a 30th Anniversary "Miracle on Ice" Edition of the game featuring the classic USA vs CCCP teams licensed through USA Hockey. Licensed games feature team colors and logos with custom hand-painted players in replica jerseys.

The early versions of the game were made with blue bases, but most of the games are now made with red bases. The first black bases were made for a Bubble Boys Tournament with Wayne Gretzky and Bud Light in 1999. There was a limited edition of 100 games with black bases made in 2005. A further limited edition with the black base was made in 2007.  The home version of the game has a base which can be split and hinged to fit through narrow doorways and comes in red or black.

Fans and tournaments
Many areas of the US have local fan sites and tournaments. Owners are known to customize their games with hand painted players representing their favorite NHL Teams (and players) and their  rivals. Starting in 2012, Labatt Blue partnered with the AHL to run a tournament of champions. Each year, the venue is a different AHL city. The first was held in Hershey PA, followed by Albany NY, Utica NY, and Glens Falls NY. 11 different AHL teams participate with 8 qualifiers, leading to an eventual 8 person tournament to win their team. The 11 winners all meet at the years Newest venue to settle who the champion will be. Considered the largest tournament ever, with over 1,000 players per year, Jeremy Davis has won twice, and Ken Dubois has won once. ICE organized an Official Super Chexx World Championship in 2010. 128 players entered - the tournament was won by John Gaffney of Burlington NJ, the official World Champion.  Other tournaments are held locally throughout the United States and Canada each year. The KONY (later KONE) Tournaments were held annually from 2001 to 2005. NJbubblehockey.org ran tournaments from 2005 to 2014 and contributed to crowning a champion in the United States every year.  The International Bubble Hockey Federation (IBHL) held a large national Super Chexx tournament in March 2006 with over 40 participants.  This was at the time the largest tournament in Bubble Hockey history.  The event was repeated on March 9–10 in 2007 with over 60 players competing over 2 days. Jeremy Davis of Milford CT was the winner and is considered the best bubble hockey player in the world (2014).

References

External links 
 International Bubble Hockey Federation (IBHF)
 ICE Factory Direct Website
Chexxfan.com
Canada's National Bubble Hockey League
New Jersey Bubble Hockey
 Northern New York Bubble Hockey League
Houston Bubble Hockey

Games of physical skill
Table hockey